John Thomas Mair (12 October 1876 – 26 November 1959) was a New Zealand architect. From 1923 until his retirement in 1941 he held the position of Government Architect.

Early life and education 
Mair was born in Invercargill, Southland, New Zealand, on 12 October 1876 to Catherine (nee Hamilton) and Hugh Mair. Hugh Mair had started as a carpenter before becoming a building contractor in partnership with his brother, Matthew. They built the water tower, and a number of large buildings. Hugh served as a borough councillor from 1892-1897 and then  mayor of Invercargill from 1897–1898.
Mair was educated at Southland Boys' High School in Invercargill.

Career
Mair commenced his architectural training in 1892 with William Sharp, engineer, architect and surveyor to the borough of Invercargill as well as engineer to the Bluff Harbour Board. 
  
In 1900 he moved to Wellington and joined the architectural branch of the New Zealand Railways where he was a member of the staff of the Office Engineer  George Troup during the time that he was designing the Dunedin railway station.
He remained with Railways for three years, before becoming chief clerk to the architectural firm of William Turnbull and Son in Wellington in Wellington. In 1906 Mair travelled to the United States of America where he studied architecture at the Beaux Arts-influenced University of Pennsylvania, where among his lecturers were Paul Cret and Thomas Nolan. He also got to know  the Australian architect  John Hennessy. Mair was one of eight out of the class of 23 to graduate and obtained a special certificate of graduation in architecture (S.C.A). 

Upon completion of his studies in 1908 he worked with the prominent firm of architect George B. Post and Sons in New York for 12 months.  In 1909 he left New York and travelled to London, England for examination prior to being admitted as an Associate of the Royal Institute of British Architects.

Return to New Zealand
After sitting the exam Mair returned via a building study tour of the United Kingdom, France and Italy to New Zealand. He  was home in Invercargill, New Zealand by October 1909. While in Invercargill he obtained the commission to  design one of his most notable early buildings, the Presbyterian First Church in Invercargill, with the plans approved in February 1910.  The church was of Romanesque character, whose design was influenced by the neo-Romanesque work of the American architect Henry Hobson Richardson. The church was completed in 1915.

By April 1910 he had moved to Wellington where he established a private practice as both an architect  and structural engineer with an office at 16 Stock Exchange Building, Featherston Street. He largely carried domestic commissions, but among his clients was the Upper Hutt Town Board. His father represented him in Invercargill. 
  
In 1918 he was appointed Inspector of Military Hospitals by the Defence Department.  He supervised the erection of King George Hospital and of the Waipukurau Sanatorium.
In 1920 he became architect to the Department of Education.

Government architect
Following the retirement of  John Campbell in 1922, Mair was appointed Government Architect in April 1923, a position which he held until his own retirement. The introduction of the Public Service Act 1912, had established a unified structure in place of the quasi-independent public sector fiefdoms under which Mair's predecessor had operated. The Act codified public service career paths in a manner that tended to be more favourable for engineers than architects. As a result Mair's office lacked autonomy as it reported to an Under-Secretary in a Public Works Department which was dominated by engineer.
In 1930 he was elected a member of the Town Planning Institute of New  Zealand.
Mair's strong leadership guided his office through the Depression, the sudden rebuilding demand of the Napier  earthquake, and the beginning of World War II.

Most of the government buildings designed during Mair's tenure as Government Architect were significant departures from the buildings designed by his predecessor with the Public Works Department adopting modernist architectural precepts with an emphasis on function, structure and volume. His designs were typically restrained with In structural terms he was a leader by utilising concrete and structural steel which provided a superior seismic ability compared with the brick and timber which had been preferred to date in New Zealand.
As Government Architect Mair was responsible for a wide range variety of buildings, including courthouse, post offices and Government administration buildings. Notable among them were the Government Life Insurance Head Office in Wellington (1939), Chief Post Office in Dunedin (1937), Stout St Departmental Building in Wellington (1940) and the Jean Batten Building in Auckland (1941).
During the difficult period of the depression Mair supported private architects in cities and towns outside Wellington by allocating government contracts to them.
For many years Mair's staff were divided between offices in the Government Buildings and the old Museum Building. In 1939 he was able to bring them into a single office located in an upper storey of the Whitmore Street annexe to the Government Buildings.

In 1941 Mair served together with the Acting Prime Minister Walter Nash, Horace Massey (president of the New Zealand Institute of Architects) and J. W. Mawson (Government Town Planner) on the jury to select a design for the clifftop mausoleum and memorial gardens for New Zealand Prime Minister,  Michael Savage at Bastion Point, Auckland.

Retirement
Following his retirement in October 1941 he was succeeded as Government Architect by his assistant Robert Adams Patterson in February 1942.   
He committed suicide on 26 November 1959 at his home in Khandallah, Wellington.

Honours
He became a Fellow of the Royal Institute of British Architects in 1940. He was also made a  Fellow of the New Zealand Institute of Architects, and became a Life Member in 1942.

Personal life
On 29 April 1914, at the age of 37, Mair was married at his parents' house in Liddel Street in Invercargill to Ethel Margaret Snow of Wellington by the Rev. R, M. Ryburn, M.A., of First Church.
Sadly within months Ethel contracted tuberculosis and died at the age of 33 in September 1915, leaving Mair to raise their eight-month-old son, John. Mair's father had died the previous month at the age of 72. Mair never remarried.

His son John Lindsay Mair also practised as an architect.

Works
Among the buildings which Mair personally designed, collaborated on or supervised the design of are:

References

Further reading
 
 
 
 
 

1876 births
1959 suicides
20th-century New Zealand architects
People from Invercargill
Suicides in New Zealand